Sami El Gueddari (born 1 February 1984 in Orléans) is a French wheelchair racer and competitive swimmer who participated in the Paralympic Games of 2008 and 2012. He was a bronze medalist at the 2009 IPC Swimming European Championships. He is a specialist of 50 meter and 100 meter freestyle.

Biography 
Sami El Gueddari suffers from congenital agenesis in the left leg, which stops at the tibia. Retired since 2013, he is now sporting director of the swimming disability program within the French Federation Handisport.

In 2019, he was a contestant in the tenth season of French version of Dancing with the Stars with partner Fauve Hautot and he won the competition.

See also 
 France at the 2008 Summer Paralympics
 France at the 2012 Summer Paralympics

References

External links 
 
 

1984 births
Living people
French male butterfly swimmers
French male freestyle swimmers
Paralympic swimmers of France
Swimmers at the 2008 Summer Paralympics
Swimmers at the 2012 Summer Paralympics
S9-classified Paralympic swimmers
Medalists at the World Para Swimming European Championships